Dominic Iorfa (born 24 June 1995) is an English professional footballer who plays as a defender for Sheffield Wednesday. He is the son of Nigerian international footballer Dominic Iorfa, and represented England at under-21 level.

Club career

Wolverhampton Wanderers
Iorfa was part of the youth system at his local club Southend United before joining the academy of Wolverhampton Wanderers at the age of 15.

He moved on a one-month loan to League One Shrewsbury Town on 18 March 2014, and made his senior debut the same day as a substitute in a 0–1 defeat at Colchester. Iorfa's first senior start came eleven days later in a 1–0 loss to Walsall at the Bescot Stadium, receiving his first yellow card also. Overall Iorfa made seven appearances for the Shrews in a campaign which ultimately resulted in relegation.

Following his return to Wolves, Iorfa made his first appearance for the club as a surprise starter in a 2–1 loss to Bournemouth at Molineux on 6 December 2014. He swiftly became the club's first choice right-back, starting in twenty-one of Wolves' twenty-five remaining fixtures following his debut. Having made his debut at the start of a 4-game unbeaten run, Iorfa became a fan favourite and a regular to the first team. In January 2015, Iorfa won the football league's Young Player Of The Month award, and that same day went on to assist a goal in a 3–0 win for Wolves against Fulham.

Iorfa received his first ever red card in the first game of the 2016–17 season, a straight red against Rotherham at the New York Stadium on 6 August 2016. Wolves were 2–0 down at the time but fought back despite being down to 10 men to draw 2–2 with goals from George Saville and Jón Daði Böðvarsson in Walter Zenga's first game as head coach.

On 14 July 2017 Iorfa was sent on a season-long loan to fellow Championship side Ipswich Town. He made 25 total appearances and scored in a 4–2 home win over Nottingham Forest on 2 December.

Sheffield Wednesday
On 31 January 2019 Iorfa moved to Sheffield Wednesday for an undisclosed fee. He would make his debut against Rotherham United on 16 February 2019, where he would score his first goal and second career goal, with the last kick of the game to draw 2-2.

The following season, he was voted as Sheffield Wednesday Player of the Year for the 2019–20 season.

In December 2020, he would rupture his Achilles in a match against Barnsley, meaning he would miss the remainder of the 20-21 season. He would return in time for the start of the 21-22 season after Wednesday had suffered relegation without him, and would make his return against Huddersfield Town in the first round of the EFL Cup. Following his return from injury, Iorfa would sign a new 2 year deal keeping him at the club until the summer of 2023.

International career
Iorfa has been capped by England at under 18, under 20 and under 21 levels. According to his father, Iorfa will consider playing for Nigeria only after his 23rd birthday.

Personal life 
His father — also named Dominic Iorfa — played as a striker and represented Nigeria at senior, and under-23 levels.

Career statistics

Honours
England U21
Toulon Tournament: 2016

Individual
Football League Young Player Of The Month: January 2015
Sheffield Wednesday Player of the Year: 2019–20

References

External links

England profile at the FA

1995 births
Living people
Sportspeople from Southend-on-Sea
English footballers
Association football defenders
Wolverhampton Wanderers F.C. players
Shrewsbury Town F.C. players
Ipswich Town F.C. players
English Football League players
England youth international footballers
English people of Nigerian descent
Black British sportspeople